Caldecott may refer to:

Awards 

 The Caldecott Medal, an award for children's book illustration named after Randolph Caldecott

People 
 Caldecott (surname)

Places 
 Caldecott, Cheshire, England
 Caldecott, Northamptonshire, United Kingdom
 Caldecott, Oxfordshire, a district of Abingdon, England
 Caldecott, Rutland, United Kingdom
 Caldecott Tunnel, California, United States
 Caldecott Hill, Singapore, home of the headquarters of MediaCorp
 Caldecott MRT station, a Circle Line MRT station in Singapore
 Caldecott Road, Hong Kong, a road named after Andrew Caldecott

See also 
 Caldecote (disambiguation)
 Caldecotte, a district in the parish of Walton, Milton Keynes, in ceremonial Buckinghamshire, England
 Caldicot (disambiguation)